The 2005–06 Eastern Michigan Eagles men's basketball team represented Eastern Michigan University during the 2005–06 NCAA Division I men's basketball season. The Eagles, led by 1st year head coach Charles E. Ramsey, played their home games at the Eastern Michigan University Convocation Center and were members of the West Division of the Mid-American Conference. They finished the season 7–21, 3–15 in MAC play. They were knocked out in the 1st round of the MAC Tournament by Western Michigan.

Roster
Source:

The team captains were John Bowler, Danny McElhinny.

Schedule
Source:

Awards 
1st Team All-MAC
 John Bowler
MAC All-Freshman team
 Carlos Medlock
MAC Freshman Of The Year
 Carlos Medlock
E-Club Hall of Fame
 Ben Braun
MAC Individual Records
 John Bowler- Scoring (563/20.1)
 2006 John Bowler- Rebounding (301/10.8)

Season Highlights 
11/01 vs Cal
 Head Coaching Debut of EMU's Charles E. Ramsey.
 EMU inducts former Head Coach Ben Braun into the EMU Athletics Hall of Fame.
01/14 vs Kent State
 EMU celebrated Kennedy McIntosh Night with the retiring of his #54 jersey

References

Eastern Michigan Eagles men's basketball seasons
Eastern Michigan
2005 in sports in Michigan
2006 in sports in Michigan